Variety Big Brother (literally Big Brother of Entertainment), also known as Big Brother's Return, was a television show hosted by Chang Fei, a.k.a. Fei Ge, which screened on Taiwanese channel China Television on Saturday evenings, Singapore Mediacorp Channel U on Sunday nights and Singapore Mediacorp Channel 8 on Friday nights. 
In 2007 the show was nominated for Best Entertainment Variety Programme at the 42nd Golden Bell Awards.

Host Chang Fei is reportedly retiring as a host but would still be involved with the show. One of the co-hosts, Kang Kang, left the show in 2004. The show ended its run on September 24, 2011.

Format
The program representative of the format and style common to Taiwanese comedy-variety shows, with amateur performances and a number of Taiwanese celebrities. Every week the show has celebrity guests and performers from Taiwan and/or abroad. It is split into two separate types of performances. The first segment uses singing performances and the second segment uses magic performances including a magic competition judged by famous magicians. Earlier episodes typically have comedy sketches with the main cast. The series has slowly progressed into a celebrity-studded show.

Like most Taiwanese variety shows, there are frequent on-screen displays (if freudian slips or puns occurred), stock sound effects and a laugh track (despite being taped in front of a fairly small audience).

Chang's brother, Fei Yu Ching, a well-known classical singer, is a frequent guest and a co-host. Co-host Ni Min Jan failed to appear in several shows, and it was later revealed he had committed suicide after he was suspected of having an affair.

International broadcast
It is shown in the United States on the San Francisco Bay Area-based television station KTSF, which shows much Chinese-language programming for the area, under the English translation Big Brother of Entertainment, the literal translation of the Chinese title.

References

Taiwanese variety shows